Bartolomeo Orsucci (died 1558) was a Roman Catholic prelate who served as Bishop of Lavello (1554–1558).

Biography
On 13 April 1554, Bartolomeo Orsucci was appointed by Pope Julius III as Bishop of Lavello.
He served as Bishop of Lavello until his death in 1558.

References

External links and additional sources
 (Chronology of Bishops) 
 (Chronology of Bishops) 

16th-century Italian Roman Catholic bishops
1558 deaths
Bishops appointed by Pope Julius III